Elicita 'Cita' Morei is a women's liberation and anti-nuclear weapons activist and writer. She is a member of the Belauan women's organization, Otil a Beluad and author of Belau Be Brave and Planting the Mustard Seed of World Peace.

Morei is also an active campaigner for the preservation of the land in the Pacific island of Palau.

Personal

Morei is the daughter of anti-nuclear campaigner and fifty-year leader of Otil a Beluad Gabriela Ngirmang.

References

Further reading 
 

Palauan activists
Anti–nuclear weapons activists
Living people
Palauan women
Women's rights activists
Year of birth missing (living people)